Jonathan Guy Varey (born 15 October 1961) is a former English first-class cricketer.

Varey was born at Darlington in County Durham. He later attended St Edmund Hall, Oxford, where he made his debut in first-class cricket for Oxford University in 1982 against Northamptonshire at Oxford. He played first-class cricket for the university until 1983, making thirteen appearances. He scored 426 runs in first-class cricket, averaging 30.42, with a highest score of 69 not out; bowling he took just 6 wickets from 209 overs bowled. While studying at Oxford, Varey was also selected to play one-day cricket for the Combined Universities, making his List A debut against Somerset at Taunton in the 1982 Benson & Hedges Cup. He played List A cricket for the Combined Universities until 1983, making a total of six appearances in the Benson & Hedges Cup. In List A matches he scored 125 runs, with a top score of 35 not out; meanwhile, with the ball he took eight wickets at 33 apiece. He played one minor counties match for Cheshire in the 1982 Minor Counties Championship. His twin brother, David Varey, also played first-class cricket.

References

External links
Jonathan Varey at ESPNcricinfo

1961 births
Living people
Sportspeople from Darlington
Cricketers from County Durham
Alumni of St Edmund Hall, Oxford
English cricketers
Oxford University cricketers
British Universities cricketers
Cheshire cricketers
Twin sportspeople